Alucita atomoclasta is a species of moth of the family Alucitidae. It is known from São Tomé and Príncipe off the western equatorial coast of Central Africa.

References

Alucitidae
Moths described in 1934
Moths of São Tomé and Príncipe
Taxa named by Edward Meyrick